Black Debbath is a Norwegian hard rock/metal band created by four of the core members of Duplex Records. They often make a political statement, calling their genre "Heavy Politically Incorrect Humor Rock".

Members
Egil Hegerberg – bass, guitar, synth, keyboard, vocals
Lars Lønning – vocals, guitar
Aslag Guttormsgaard – guitar, bass, vocals
Ole Petter Andreassen – drums, vocals

Session members
Per Berdtrand Aanonsen, drums (1999). Played drums on most of the first album.
Ronni Le Tekrø, guitar (2018). Guest guitarist on the song "Tons of Rock".

Discography

Studio albums
Tung, tung politisk rock (1999)
Welcome to Norway (2001)
Den femte statsmakt (2004)
Naar vi døde rocker (en tungrockhyllest til Ibsen) (2006)
Black Debbath hyller kvinnen! (2007)
Nå får det faen meg være rock! Akademisk stoner-rock! (2013)
Universell Riffsynsing (2015)
Norsk barsk metal (2018)

Singles
"Problemer innad i Høyre" (1999)
"Mongo Norway (a guide to nightlife in Oslo)" (2001)
"Martin Schanke" (2001)
"Den femte statsmakt" (2004)
"Motörhedda Gabler" (2006)
"Striden om Ibsens møblement" (2006)
"Nei til runkesti på Ekeberg" (2013)
"Bytt kjøkkenklut oftere" (2013)
"Pensjonsballade" (2015)
"Kompetansesentra for rytmisk musikk og rock (demo)" (2016)
"Klein Kaffe" (2016)
"1001-1002-1003" (2016)
"PILS!" (2018)

References

External links
Black Debbath
Duplex Records - Bare enda et plateselskap
Black Debbath

Norwegian doom metal musical groups
Norwegian rock music groups
Musical quartets
Musical groups established in 1998
1998 establishments in Norway
Musical groups from Oslo
Grappa Music artists
Comedy rock musical groups
Norwegian stoner rock musical groups